(born February 17, 1960), is a retired Japanese professional wrestler, who was based in New Japan Pro-Wrestling (NJPW).

Career
Shunji Kosugi made his debut on January 11, 1981 against Norio Honaga. He was known for his technical prowess in the ring, influenced by Karl Gotch. He was the last man to defeat Satoru Sayama, before Sayama became Tiger Mask and also the very first opponent of the future Jushin Thunder Liger, Keiichi Yamada. Kosugi's biggest accomplishment came in April 1985, when he defeated Yamada to win the very first Young Lion Cup.

As time went on, Kosugi suffered a severe back injury, which forced him to retire on April 10, 1988. His last recorded match as an active wrestler occurred on March 18, teaming with Don Arakawa, losing to Hiro Saito and Norio Honaga.

Retirement
After retiring from the ring, he returned to his hometown to run a liquor store, owned by his wife's family.

On September 26, 2010, after over 22 years since his last match, Kosugi made a surprise return in a battle royal, held by Tatsumi Fujinami's Dradition promotion. Although he lost, he received a standing ovation by body slamming Kikutaro.

On September 18, 2019, at a Pro Wrestling Zero1 in Sado, he handed a bouquet to the soon retiring Jushin Thunder Liger.

Championships and accomplishments
New Japan Pro-Wrestling
Young Lion Cup (1985)
Tokyo Sports
Service Award (1988)

References

External links
Cagematch profile
Genickbruch profile

1960 births
Living people
Japanese male professional wrestlers
Sportspeople from Niigata Prefecture
People from Sado, Niigata